Argyll is a residential neighbourhood in Edmonton, Alberta, Canada, located on the south side of the city between the two branches of the Mill Creek Ravine.  It is bounded by the ravine on the west and north east sides, and by Argyll Road on the south and south east sides.  On the other side of Mill Creek Ravine are the residential neighbourhoods of Avonmore and Hazeldean.  On the other side of Argyll Road is the industrial subdivision of Coronet Addition Industrial.  The Argyll Sports Centre is located in the neighbourhood.

Most residential construction (93%) in the neighbourhood occurred between the end of World War II and 1970.  Almost all the residences in the neighbourhood are single-family dwellings.  The majority (83%) of residences are owner-occupied.

The community is represented by the Argyll community league, established in 1956, which maintains a community hall at 67 Avenue and 88 Street.

Demographics 

Household income for Argyll is close to the average for the City of Edmonton.

See also 
 Edmonton Federation of Community Leagues

References

External links 
 Argyll Neighbourhood Profile

Neighbourhoods in Edmonton